The National Archives of Zambia preserve the archives of the Republic of Zambia and maintain its legal deposit library. The library holds 70,000 volumes. Its headquarters  are located in Ridgeway in the city of Lusaka.

Mission Statement 
To effectively manage and preserve public records, archives, printed and non-printed publications in order to facilitate lawful access to this information to all stakeholders, thereby promoting efficiency and effective government administration.

Mandate 

 To provide for the preservation, custody, control and disposal of public archives including public records of Zambia;
 Registration of newspapers;
 To provide for the printing and publication of books; and
 The preservation of printed works published in Zambia.

The Role 
The role of the National Archives will be to provide an efficient and effective records management system and safe custody of all public records, archives and printed and non-printed publications in order to ensure lawful access to information by government institutions and the general public.”

Notes

References

See also 
 List of national archives

Bibliography
  
  (Part of the National Archives)
 
  
  
 . Abstract. Paper presented at conference in Senegal "Archives of Post-Independence Africa and its Diaspora" (Includes information on National Archives)

External links 
 http://www.nationalarchiveszambia.org/
 

Zambia
Buildings and structures in Lusaka
Zambian culture
Libraries in Zambia
History of Zambia